The 1100s was a decade of the Julian Calendar which began on January 1, 1100, and ended on December 31, 1109.

Significant people
 Henry I of England
 Su Song
 Al-Mustazhir
 Berkyaruq

References